Willy Stettner (1895–1961) was a German singer and stage and film actor.

Selected filmography
 The Land of Smiles (1930)
 How Do I Become Rich and Happy? (1930)
 The Night Without Pause (1931)
 Victoria and Her Hussar (1931)
 Schubert's Dream of Spring (1931)
 Quick (1932)
 Daughter of the Regiment (1933)
 Madame Wants No Children (1933)
 A Thousand for One Night (1933)
 Ball at the Savoy (1935)
 Twilight (1940)
 The Last Man (1955)

References

Bibliography 
 Erika Wottrich. Deutsche Universal.: Transatlantische Verleih- und Produktionsstrategien eines Hollywood-Studios in den 20er und 30er Jahren.. 2001.

External links 
 

Actors from Darmstadt
1895 births
1961 deaths
German male film actors
German male stage actors